Ramón Juárez Del Castillo (born 9 May 2001) is a Mexican professional footballer who plays as a centre-back for Liga MX club América.

Club career
Juárez made his professional debut for Liga MX club América on 27 August 2019 in the Apertura 2019 against Pachuca. He came on as a substitute.

International career
Juárez participated at the 2022 Maurice Revello Tournament, scoring one goal in all five matches, attaining third place at the tournament.

Career statistics

Club

References

2001 births
Living people
Mexican footballers
Mexico youth international footballers
Association football defenders
Club América footballers
Liga MX players